Santiago Frias (born January 1, 2003) is a Canadian soccer player who currently plays for Sigma FC in League1 Ontario.

College career
In August 2021, Frias began attending the University of Akron and was unveiled by the Akron Zips as part of their newcomer class. He made his debut on August 26, 2021 against the Wright State Raiders. He scored his first goal on September 2, 2022, also against Wright State.

Club career
On June 24, 2021, Canadian Premier League club Forge FC announced that they had signed Frias to a developmental contract. He made his professional debut on July 22 against Cavalry FC. He played one match with Forge's affiliate team, Sigma FC in League1 Ontario in 2021. At the end of the season, he departed Forge.

For the 2022 season, he played with Sigma FC.

References

External links
 

2003 births
Living people
Canadian soccer players
Association football defenders
Soccer people from Ontario
Sportspeople from Oakville, Ontario
Canadian Premier League players
League1 Ontario players
Forge FC players
Sigma FC players
Akron Zips men's soccer players